Carroll County Sheriff's Quarters and Jail is a historic combined sheriffs residence and jail located in Carrollton, Carroll County, Missouri. It was built in 1878 and consists of the two-story brick residence with an attached jail, constructed in 1958 to replace the original jail, which had collapsed. The residence is a Classical Revival-style brick building topped by a hipped roof.

It was listed on the National Register of Historic Places in 1979.

References

Courthouses on the National Register of Historic Places in Missouri
Neoclassical architecture in Missouri
Government buildings completed in 1878
Buildings and structures in Carroll County, Missouri
National Register of Historic Places in Carroll County, Missouri